Laal is a 2019 Pakistani military action television film written by Umera Ahmed and directed by Haseeb Hassan. It is produced by Geo Films and features Bilal Abbas Khan and Kubra Khan in leads. The original soundtrack of Laal was written and performed by Shuja Haider. The film premiered on Geo Entertainment on 23 March 2019 on the occasion of Pakistan Day. It was made available on the digital platform Amazon Prime in October 2019.

Plot 
The story is about a young boy named Behram who lives near Ormara coastal line, Balochistan. His father works for a fishing troller which barely aids their survival. Like his older brother Yousuf, his father hopes for Behram to become a fisherman. But, Behram has his eyes set on another dream. Inspired by the Navy officers, he hopes to get education and join the Navy. His dreams are realised when he meets a Navy family willing to help Behram. After 15 years, Behram returns to his hometown after becoming a Naval officer. His return presents him with a life-altering challenge and demands of him a sacrifice that earns him the nation's pride (Laal).

Cast
Bilal Abbas as Behram
Kubra Khan as Zarminay
Gohar Rasheed as Yousuf
Iffat Rahim
Adnan Shah Tipu
Saleem Mairaj
Sidra Niazi

References

External links 

Pakistani television films
Geo TV
2019 action films
Urdu-language television shows
2019 films